The 2021 Big East Conference softball tournament was held at Connecticut Softball Stadium on the campus of the University of Connecticut in Storrs, Connecticut. The tournament was held from May 13 through May 15, 2021 and determined the champion for the Big East Conference for the 2021 NCAA Division I softball season. As the tournament champion, Villanova earned the Big East Conference's automatic bid to the 2021 NCAA Division I softball tournament. The semifinals and finals were broadcast on Fox Sports 2.

Format and seeding
The top four teams from the conference's round-robin regular season qualified for the tournament, and were seeded one through four. They played a double-elimination tournament. Due to COVID-19 protocols, Creighton was unable to participate in the Tournament, resulting in Butler claiming the fourth seed.

Tournament

Bracket

Game results

References

Big East Tournament
Big East Conference softball tournament
Big East Conference softball tournament